The European Free Alliance (EFA) is a European political party that consists of various regionalist, separatist and ethnic minority political parties in Europe. Member parties advocate either for full political independence and sovereignty, or some form of devolution or self-governance for their country or region. The alliance has generally limited its membership to progressive parties; therefore, only a fraction of European regionalist parties are members of the EFA.

Since 1999, the EFA and the European Green Party (EGP) have joined forces within Greens–European Free Alliance (Greens/EFA) group in the European Parliament, although some EFA members have joined other groups from time to time.

The EFA's youth wing is the European Free Alliance Youth (EFAY), founded in 2000.

As of 2021, four European regions are led by EFA politicians: Scotland with Nicola Sturgeon of the Scottish National Party, Flanders with Jan Jambon of the New Flemish Alliance, Corsica with Gilles Simeoni of For Corsica, and Catalonia with Pere Aragonès of the Republican Left of Catalonia.

History
Regionalists have long been represented in the European Parliament. In the 1979 election four regionalist parties obtained seats: the Scottish National Party (SNP), the Flemish People's Union (VU), the Brussels-based Democratic Front of Francophones (FDF) and the South Tyrolean People's Party (SVP). The SNP, although being predominantly social-democratic, joined the European Progressive Democrats, a conservative group led by the French Rally for the Republic. The VU and the FDF joined the heterogeneous Technical Group of Independents, while the SVP joined the European People's Party group.

In 1981 six parties (VU, the Frisian National Party, Independent Fianna Fáil, the Party of German-speaking Belgians, the Party for the Organization of a Free Brittany and the Alsace-Lorraine National Association), plus three observers (the Union of the Corsican People, UPC, the Occitan Party and the Democratic Convergence of Catalonia, CDC), joined forces to form the European Free Alliance. Regionalist MEPs continued, however, to sit in different groups also after the 1984 election: the SNP in the Gaullist-dominated European Democratic Alliance; the VU, the Sardinian Action Party (PSd'Az) and Basque Solidarity (EA) in the Rainbow Group, together with Green parties; the SVP in the European People's Party group; the CDC with the Liberal Democrats; and Herri Batasuna among Non-Inscrits.

Only after the 1989 European Parliament election did EFA members form a united group, called Rainbow like its green predecessor. It consisted of three Italian MEPs (two for Lega Lombarda and one for the PSd'Az), two Spanish MEPs (one each for the PNV and the Andalusian Party, PA), one Belgian MEP (for VU), one French MEP (UPC), one British MEP (SNP) and one independent MEP from Ireland. They were joined by 4 MEPs from the Danish left-wing Eurosceptic People's Movement against the EU, while the other regionalist parties, including the SVP, Batasuna and the Convergence and Union of Catalonia (CiU) declined to join.

In the 1994 European Parliament election the regionalists lost many seats. Moreover, the EFA had suspended its major affiliate, Lega Nord, for having joined forces in government with the post-fascist National Alliance. Also, the PNV chose to switch to the European People's Party (EPP). The three remaining EFA MEPs (representing the SNP, the VU and the Canarian Coalition) formed a group with the French Énergie Radicale list and the Italian Pannella List: the European Radical Alliance.

Following the 1999 European Parliament election, in which EFA parties did quite well, EFA elected MEPs formed a joint group with the European Green Party, under the name Greens–European Free Alliance (Greens/EFA). In the event the EFA supplied ten members: two each from the Scottish SNP, the Welsh Plaid Cymru, and the Flemish VU, and one each from the Basque PNV and EA, the Andalusian PA and the Galician Nationalist Bloc (BNG).

In the 2004 European Parliament election, the EFA, which had formally become a European political party, was reduced to four MEPs: two from the SNP (Ian Hudghton and Alyn Smith), one from Plaid Cymru (Jill Evans) and one from the Republican Left of Catalonia (ERC; Bernat Joan i Marí, replaced at the mid-term by MEP Mikel Irujo of the Basque EA). They were joined by two associate members: Tatjana Ždanoka of For Human Rights in United Latvia (PCTVL) and László Tőkés, an independent MEP and former member of the Democratic Alliance of Hungarians in Romania (UMDR). Co-operation between the EFA and the Greens continued.

Following the 2008 revision of the EU Regulation that governs European political parties allowing the creation of European foundations affiliated to European political parties, the EFA established its official foundation/think tank, the Coppieters Foundation (CF), in September 2007.

In the 2009 European Parliament election, six MEPs were returned for the EFA: two from the SNP (Ian Hudghton and Alyn Smith), one from Plaid Cymru (Jill Evans), one from the Party of the Corsican Nation (PNC; François Alfonsi), one from the ERC (Oriol Junqueras), and Tatjana Ždanoka, an individual member of the EFA from Latvia. After the election, the New Flemish Alliance (N-VA) also joined the EFA. The EFA subgroup thus counted seven MEPs.

In the 2014 European Parliament election, EFA-affiliated parties returned twelve seats to the Parliament: four for the N-VA, two for the SNP, two for "The Left for the Right to Decide" (an electoral list primarily composed of the ERC), one for "The Peoples Decide" (an electoral list mainly comprising EH Bildu, a Basque coalition including EA), one for "European Spring" (an electoral list comprising the Valencian Nationalist Bloc, BNV, and the Aragonese Union, ChA), one from Plaid Cymru, and one from the Latvian Russian Union (LKS). Due to ideological divergences with the Flemish Greens, the N-VA defected to the European Conservatives and Reformists (ECR) group and the EH Bildu MEP joined the European United Left–Nordic Green Left (GUE/NGL) group. Thus, EFA had seven members in the Greens/EFA group and four within ECR.

In the 2019 European Parliament election the EFA gained a fourth seat in the United Kingdom, due to the SNP gaining a third seat to add to Plaid's one. However, the EFA suffered the loss of these seats in January 2020 due to Brexit, which meant SNP and PC MEPs had to leave.

Ideology
In the Brussels declaration of 2000 the EFA codified its political principles. The EFA stands for "a Europe of Free Peoples based on the principle of subsidiarity, which believe in solidarity with each other and the peoples of the world." The EFA sees itself as an alliance of stateless peoples, striving towards recognition, autonomy, independence or wanting a proper voice in Europe. It supports European integration on basis of the subsidiarity-principle. It believes also that Europe should move away from further centralisation and works towards the formation of a "Europe of regions". It believes that regions should have more power in Europe, for instance participating in the Council of the European Union, when matters within their competence are discussed. It also wants to protect the linguistic and cultural diversity within the EU.

The EFA broadly stands on the left wing of the political spectrum. EFA members are generally progressive, although there are some notable exceptions as the conservative New Flemish Alliance, Bavaria Party, Democratic Party of Artsakh, Schleswig Party and Future of Åland, the Christian-democratic Slovene Union, the centre-right Liga Veneta Repubblica, the far-right South Tyrolean Freedom and Hungarian People's Party of Transylvania which is said to be close to Fidesz.

Organisation
The main organs of the EFA organisation are the General Assembly, the Bureau and the Secretariat.

General Assembly
In the General Assembly, the supreme council of the EFA, every member party has one vote.

Bureau and Secretariat
The Bureau takes care of daily affairs. It is chaired by Lorena Lopez de Lacalle (Basque Solidarity), president of the EFA, while Jordi Solé (Republican Left of Catalonia) is secretary-general and Anke Spoorendonk (South Schleswig Voters' Association) treasurer.

The Bureau is completed by ten vice-presidents: Peggy Eriksson (Future of Åland), Jill Evans (Plaid Cymru), Fernando Fuente Cortina (More—Commitment), David Grosclaude (Occitan Party), Wouter Patho (New Flemish Alliance), Frank de Boer (Frisian National Party), Patrik Peroša (The Olive Tree – Slovene Istria Party) and Livia Ceccaldi-Volpei (Femu à Corsica).

Member parties

Before becoming a member party, an organisation needs to have been an observer of the EFA for at least one year. Only one member party per region is allowed. If a second party from a region wants to join the EFA, the first party needs to agree, at which point these two parties will then form a common delegation with one vote. The EFA also recognises friends of the EFA, a special status for regionalist parties outside of the European Union.

The following is the list of EFA members and former members.

Full members

Individual Members

Suspended Members

Former members

See also
List of regional and minority parties in Europe
List of active separatist movements in Europe
Political parties of minorities
Regionalism (politics)

References

External links

The Greens/EFA official website
EFA in the European Parliament
European Free Alliance Youth
Declaration of Brussels of 9 November 2000
Toward a Europe of diversity – Manifesto for the 2004 EP election
Vision for a People's Europe – Manifesto for the 2009 EP election
It's time for self-determination for all the peoples of Europe – Manifesto for the 2014 EP election
Eric Defoort (editor), The European Free Alliance: The voice of nations and peoples of Europe. 30 years EFA, 2011
Tudi Kernalegenn, The internationalism of the EFA, European Free Alliance, 2011
Peter Lynch, Organising for a Europe of the Regions: The European Free Alliance-DPPE and Political Representation in the European Union, 2007

 
Pan-European political parties
Politics of Europe
1981 establishments in Belgium